The White Sheik, also known as King's Mate, is a 1928 British silent adventure film directed by Harley Knoles and starring Lillian Hall-Davis, Jameson Thomas and Warwick Ward. It was based on the novel King's Mate by Rosita Forbes.

Synopsis
While spending the winter in the Moroccan city of Fez young Englishwoman Rosemary encounters a vile man Martengo who tries to force his attentions on her. Escaping to the desert she becomes lost and is rescued by a mysterious Englishman known as the White Sheik.

Cast
 Lillian Hall-Davis as Rosemary Tregarthen
 Jameson Thomas as Westwyn
 Warwick Ward as Martengo
 Clifford McLaglen as Manheebe
 Gibb McLaughlin as Jock
 Forrester Harvey as Pat
 Julie Suedo as Zarita

Release
For its December 1929 New York City premiere at the Little Carnegie Playhouse it was accompanied by the Hal Roach Studios comedy Feed ’em and Weep and the Universum Film AG documentary short Strange Prayers.

Reception
The New York Times reviewer Mordaunt Hall called the film "amateurish" and "boring", with characters he thought "as silly a lot as have ever darted to and fro on the screen."

References

External links

1928 films
1928 adventure films
British adventure films
Films shot at British International Pictures Studios
1920s English-language films
Films directed by Harley Knoles
British silent feature films
British black-and-white films
Films set in Morocco
Films based on British novels
Silent adventure films
1920s British films